Robert Paul Sables (born June 5, 1938) was an American naval historian and author.

Education 
Sables graduated in 1962 from the University of Scranton, Pennsylvania, and earned an MSW from Fordham University, New York City, in 1965.

Military career 
Sables was commissioned a 1st Lieutenant on November 12, 1970, and served in the 102nd Medical Battalion, 42nd Infantry Division, New York Army National Guard, and retired a lieutenant colonel from the U.S. Army Reserve in 1998.

Civilian career 
He also served as a probation officer for the City of New York for twenty years. Upon retirement, he began researching and writing about U.S. Naval history. Many of his articles have been published in Sea Classics, a monthly periodical which focuses on the history of naval vessels. Sables has been married to his wife Cathy since 1967, and they raised four children (daughters Jacqueline and Delia, sons William and Robert).

Magazine articles 
“The Armed Yacht’s of World War II.” Sea Classics, December 2000, Volume 33, Number 12.
“The Coastal Patrol Yachts of WW II.” Sea Classics, July 2001, Volume 34, Number 7.
“Above US the Sea: ‘O-Class’ Submarines of World Wars I and II.” Sea Classics, October 2001, Volume 34, Number 10.
“The Tuna Fleet That Went to War.” Sea Classics, April 2002, Volume 35, Number 4.
“Coast Guard Emergency WW II Acquisitions.” Sea Classics, October 2002, Volume 35, Number 10.
“When Corvettes Flew the Stars and Stripes.” Sea Classics, November 2003, Volume 36, Number 11.
“Fatal Impact: Naval Collisions in WW II.” Sea Classics, February 2004, Volume 37, Number 2.
“Corvina’s Mysterious First and Last War Patrol.” Sea Classics, October 2005, Volume 38, Number 10.
“PC-815: The Jinxed Sub-Chaser! USS PC-815.” Sea Classics, January 2006, Volume 39, Number 1.
“The 53 Days of LST-921 The 53 Days of LST-921.” Sea Classics, December 2006, Volume 39, Number 12.

Books 
Mates Forever, USS Wasmuth and USS Ramapo. Victoria: Trafford, 2004.

See also
USS PC-815

External links 
“Overdue Atlantic”, USS Cythera (PY 26)
“Lost With All Hands, The Story of USS SC-1024”  
“Too Short a Time/A History of the USS Holder (DE-401)"
“The Evarts/Fighting DE’s"

1938 births
American naval historians
American male non-fiction writers
University of Scranton alumni
Fordham University alumni
Probation and parole officers
Living people